is a yonkoma manga series by Risu Akizuki about OLs, or office ladies. It follows the daily lives of Minako and Jun, the coworkers, friends, family, and neighbors. It also had a short, spin-off series titled Okusama Shinkaron that focused on housewives.

Several different translations in English, including two bilingual Japanese/English series titled Survival in the Office and OL Revolution, have been published. The manga, along with Akizuki's other works, won the 2004 short story award at the Tezuka Osamu Cultural Prizes.

Story
The manga is episodic and follows the daily lives of Minako and Jun, two office ladies working in post-bubble Japan. Each vignette contains a gag about happenings at the office where Minako and Jun work, socializing after work, vacations, or interactions with their friends, family, and neighbors.

As the series progresses, there are a number of secondary characters who make regular appearances in the manga, including Jun's boss and his wife, Ichirō, Satsuki, Keiko, Hiromi, Tanaka, an old man who runs a diner, Morishita, Jun's parents, and others.

History
OL Shinkaron began running as a yonkoma manga series in 1989 in issue 50 of Weekly Morning, a seinen manga magazine published by Kodansha.

Manga releases
The manga was collected in the following tankōbon, published by Kodansha under their  imprint:
Volume 1 (October 1990)
Volume 2 (June 1991)
Volume 3 (December 1991)
Volume 4 (June 1992)
Volume 5 (January 1993)
Volume 6 (September 1993)
Volume 7 (April 1994)
Volume 8 (December 1994)
Volume 9 (July 1995)
Volume 10 (March 1996)
Volume 11 (November 1996)
Volume 12 (May 1997)
Volume 13 (March 1998)
Volume 14 (October 1998)
Volume 15 (October 1999)
Volume 16 (March 2000)
Volume 17 (November 2000)
Volume 18 (August 2001)
Volume 19 (May 2002)
Volume 20 (September 2003)
Volume 21 (May 2004)
Volume 22 (November 2004)
Volume 23 (May 2005)
Volume 24 (December 2005)
Volume 25 (June 2006)
Volume 26 (January 2007)
Volume 27 (September 2007)
Volume 28 (June 2008)
Volume 29 (May 2009)
Volume 30 (March 2010)
Volume 31 (March 2011)
Volume 32 (October 2011)
Volume 33 (July 2012)
Volume 34 (March 2013)
Volume 35 (November 2013)
Volume 36 (December 2014)
Volume 37 (December 2015)
Volume 38 (February 2020)
Volume 39 (July 2020)
Volume 40 (August 2020)
Volume 41 (September 2020, 
Volume 42 (October 2020)

Two volumes under the title The OL Comes of Age were published as part of Kodansha's English Library series:
Volume 1 (November 1994)
Volume 2 (March 1999)

Kodansha also published bilingual editions through Kodansha International:

Survival in the Office:
Volume 1 (September 1999)
Volume 2 (March 2000)
Volume 3 (July 2000)
Volume 4 (October 2000)
Volume 5 (September 2000)

OL Revolution:
Volume 1 (September 2005)
Volume 2 (September 2005)
Volume 3 (September 2005)

Spinoffs and related
OL Shinkaron had a number of spin-offs and related works:
 . This short series served as a precursor to OL Shinkaron. It has not been published in a collection. 
 . Ran in Josei Jishin and featured a character named Pon-chan ho looked just like Jun from OL Shinkaron. Collected by Kobunsha in one volume in November 1992.
 : A yonkoma series that ran in Kodansha's  from 1988 to 1990. The series focused on housewives and was collected in one tankōbon in January 1992.

Awards and recognition
This series, in conjunction with Akizuki's other works, received the Tezuka Osamu Cultural Prize in the short story category in 2004.

References

External links
 

1990 manga
Kodansha manga
Seinen manga
Yonkoma